Talamalla  is a village of Podili mandal in Prakasam district, Andhra Pradesh. It is an independent panchayat with population of around 3000.

References
Villages in Prakasam district